The Nazran uprising was an uprising by Ingush rebels in 1858 due to the harsh policies of the tsarist authorities to forcibly enlarge settlements, depriving the highlanders of the right to carry knives.

Chronology
The colonial policy of the tsarist authorities caused discontent of Caucasians. The population became aware of the plans of tsarism for the forcible merging of small settlements into large ones, the ban on carrying knives for the local population, and a number of other prohibitions and restrictions.

In May 1858, the discontent of the population resulted in an open armed uprising, led by the cadet Chandyr Archakov, the standard-bearer Magomet Mazurov (Sultygov) and Dzhagostuko Bekhoev. The rebels, numbering 5 thousand people, attempted to storm the Nazran fortress, which, however, was unsuccessful.

As a response, large military formations were put forward from Vladikavkaz, led by Colonel Zotov, acting chief of staff of the troops of the left wing of the Caucasian line. The troops arrived in Nazran on 24 May. Zotov ordered the local foremen to calm the people, but the foremen no longer controlled the situation.

On May 25, the rebels sent a delegation of 16 people to Zotov. Zotov took four people from among them as hostages and demanded an end to the unrest. The rebels, having learned about the capture of parliamentarians, rushed to storm the fortress, but suffered heavy losses and were forced to retreat.

The rebels Nazranians and Galashkins invited Imam Shamil in June-July 1858, but he failed twice to break through to help the rebels.

Aftermath
The leaders of the uprising Chandyr Archakov, Magomed Mazurov, Dzhogast Bekhoev, mullahs Bashir Ashiev (Kumyk) and Urusbi Mugaev were sentenced to hanging. Bekhoev managed to escape, four others were hanged on June 25, 1858. 32 people were sentenced to 1000 blows with gauntlets each, 30 to hard labor, five to indefinite work in mines, 25 to work in factories for 8 years.

Although the uprising ended tragically for the rebels, it saved them from more serious events. At that time, the authorities were discussing the project “On the increase in the Russian population in the Caucasus with the resettlement of mountaineers from there to the Don”. After the uprising, the leadership of Russia concluded:

References

Bibliography 
 
 

History of Ingushetia
Battles involving Ingushetia
Conflicts in 1858
Caucasian War